Ulf Tobias Enström (born 5 November 1984) is a Swedish former professional ice hockey defenceman who played in the National Hockey League with the Atlanta Thrashers and Winnipeg Jets. He left the NHL after 11 seasons to return and captain original Swedish club, Modo Hockey of HockeyAllsvenskan.

Playing career

Early career

Growing up in Nordingrå, Enström played hockey in Höga Kusten Hockey but moved to Örnsköldsvik and Modo Hockey when was accepted to the Hockey high school playing for Modo J18. After two second places with Modo's J18, he advanced to Modo's J20 and later to the Elitserien team.

Following a successful rookie season during his first year in Elitserien, where he was elected Rookie of the Year, he was drafted in the 2003 NHL Entry Draft by the Atlanta Thrashers in the eighth round, 239th overall. He won the 2006–07 Swedish Elite League championships with Modo Hockey and finished first in assists in the playoffs.

Atlanta/Winnipeg
Enström signed a two-year contract with Atlanta in late May 2007 and made the team out of training camp, playing all 82 in his first three seasons to start his career. He scored his first NHL goal on 23 October 2007, against Vesa Toskala of the Toronto Maple Leafs. Enström finished the season with five goals and 33 assists. The following season, he recorded five goals along with 27 assists, as well as attaining a career-high +14 plus-minus rating. During the 2010–11 season, he broke a finger blocking a shot against the New York Rangers on 22 January 2011, that ruled him out for six games and ended his games played streak at 296 consecutive games.

In 2011, Enström was selected to his first All-Star Game, along with teammate Dustin Byfuglien. This was the first time the Thrashers had a defenseman in the All-Star Game since Petr Buzek in 2000. His injury sustained against the Rangers, however, prevented him from playing in the game.

Return to Sweden
On 25 August 2018, Enström signed a one-year deal with Modo Hockey of HockeyAllsvenskan.

Personal life
He comes from a hockey family where both of his brothers, Tommy Enström and Thomas Enström, as well as his sister, Tina Enström, all are or have represented various teams within the Modo Hockey organization.

In June 2013, Enström was assaulted and robbed in his hometown of Örnsköldsvik, but recovered quickly from only minor injuries. The perpetrator was later arrested and is being tried for robbery and battery.

Career statistics

Regular season and playoffs

International

Awards and achievements

-Selected, Did Not Play due to Injury

Records
 Atlanta Thrashers' franchise record for most points (defenceman): 108 (16 January 2010 vs. Carolina Hurricanes) (surpassed Yannick Tremblay)
 Atlanta Thrashers' franchise record for most assists in a season (defenceman): 44 (16 January 2010 vs. Carolina Hurricanes)
 Atlanta Thrashers' franchise record for most games in a row: 296 (22 January 2011 vs. New York Rangers) (surpassed Vyacheslav Kozlov)

References

External links
 

1984 births
Living people
Atlanta Thrashers draft picks
Atlanta Thrashers players
EC Red Bull Salzburg players
Ice hockey players at the 2010 Winter Olympics
Modo Hockey players
Olympic ice hockey players of Sweden
People from Kramfors Municipality
Swedish expatriate ice hockey players in Canada
Swedish expatriate ice hockey players in the United States
Swedish ice hockey defencemen
Winnipeg Jets players
Sportspeople from Västernorrland County